Ismoil Talbakov (24 March 1955 – 17 December 2016) was a Tajik politician, presidential  candidate in Tajikistan's 2006 presidential election, representing the Communist Party.

References

1955 births
2016 deaths
Communist Party of Tajikistan politicians
Tajik National University alumni
People from Khatlon Region